Sierra Nevada University (SNU) was a private university in Incline Village, Nevada in the Sierras.

History 
Founded in 1969, Sierra Nevada College was accredited by the Northwest Commission on Colleges and Universities. Prior to 2020, the institution was known as Sierra Nevada College. In the summer of 2019, Dr. Ed Zschau became the interim president of Sierra Nevada University and, among other initiatives, spearheaded the change in the institution's name. It was announced in July 2021 that the Sierra Nevada University is being merged into the University of Nevada Reno over a period of years. Certain of the programs, courses and professors of Sierra Nevada University would be kept by the University of Nevada Reno. On July 21, 2022 the university formally ceased operations and became the University of Nevada, Reno at Lake Tahoe.

Academics
The Departments of Fine Arts, Humanities and Social Sciences, Business, and Science and Technology offer traditional majors as well as Interdisciplinary Studies programs. The Business department at SNU also offers Ski Business and Resort Management as a four-year degree. The teacher education program leads to Master of Arts in Teaching, Master of Arts in Administration and Masters in Education degrees as well as to teacher licensure in Nevada. The College also operates two low-residency, Masters of Fine Arts programs. Creative Writing and Interdisciplinary Arts MFA's use a low-residency format and individual mentoring to prepare artists and writers for professional and artistic success.

The MFA-IA program focuses on site-specific and community practice, with a large part of each residency taking place off site at partner locations such as the Sagehen Creek Field Station.

SNU, in collaboration with UC Davis Tahoe Environmental Research Center (TERC), houses the Tahoe Center for Environmental Sciences, a facility conducting research on Lake Tahoe.

From 2016 to 2019, as part of an initiative to expand access to four-year degrees, SNU also operated extension centers on community college campuses. There are SNU Extension centers currently on the campus of Lake Tahoe Community College in South Lake Tahoe, Truckee Meadows Community College's Dandini Campus in Reno, Nevada. Each Extension Center offered degrees specific to demand on the campus where they are located, and included B.A. in Psychology, B.A. or B.S. in General Studies, a B.S. in Business Administration (B.S.B.A) in Entrepreneurship or Global Business Management.

Summer visiting artist workshops
Sierra Nevada University hosts an extensive program of Summer Visiting Artist Workshops which feature well-known artists from multiple disciplines. Artists such as printmaker Sean Starwars, and visual artist and experimental filmmaker Tim Guthrie are regular workshop leaders.

Athletics 
The Sierra Nevada athletic teams were called the Eagles. The university was a member of the National Association of Intercollegiate Athletics (NAIA), primarily competing in the California Pacific Conference (CalPac) from 2015–16 (when the school joined the NAIA) to 2021–22.

Sierra Nevada competed in 13 intercollegiate athletic teams: Men's sports included alpine skiing, cross country, freeskiing, golf, lacrosse, snowboarding and soccer; while women's sports included alpine skiing, cross country, freeskiing, golf, snowboarding and soccer.

Skiing
The Eagles have won many United States Collegiate Ski and Snowboard Association national championships in both men's and women's events.

Notable faculty, past and present 
 Laura McCullough – poet (Masters in Fine Arts Program)
 Suzanne Roberts – American poet, travel writer, and photographer (Creative Writing Faculty – Distinguished Writer-in-Residence 2011–2012)
 Carolee Schneeman – Experimental filmmaker (Visiting professor, 1994) 
 Brian Turner – poet (Program Chair - Masters in Fine Arts in Creative Writing Program)
 Patricia Smith – poet (Creative Writing Faculty)
 Gayle Brandeis – author (Creative Writing Faculty - Distinguished Visiting Professor/Writer in Residence 2014-2015)

Notable alumni
 Matea Ferk (born 1987) – Croatia Ski Team, Women's Alpine Skiing, 2006 and 2010 Winter Olympics.
 Philip "P.K." O'Neill (born 1951) – Republican member of the Nevada Assembly.
 Tea Palic (born 1991) – Croatia Ski Team, Women's Alpine Skiing, 2010 Winter Olympics.

References

External links
 
 Official athletics website

1969 establishments in Nevada
Buildings and structures in Washoe County, Nevada
Education in Washoe County, Nevada
Educational institutions established in 1969
Lake Tahoe
Liberal arts colleges in Nevada
Universities and colleges accredited by the Northwest Commission on Colleges and Universities
Private universities and colleges in Nevada